The 1988 USA Outdoor Track and Field Championships took place between June 16–19 at Pepin-Rood Stadium on the campus of University of Tampa in Tampa, Florida. The meet was organized by The Athletics Congress. This was the last time the National Championships were held separately from the Olympic Trials in the same year. With the Trials held four weeks later, many athletes made decisions to forgo the National Championships in order to be ready for the trials. Starting in 1992, the two meets were combined.

Results

Men track events

Men field events

Women track events

Women field events

See also
United States Olympic Trials (track and field)

References

 Results from T&FN
 results

USA Outdoor Track and Field Championships
Usa Outdoor Track And Field Championships, 1988
Track and field
Track and field in Florida
USA Outdoor Track and Field Championships
USA Outdoor Track and Field Championships